Nonuya (Nononotá, Nyonuhu, Nonuña, Achiote) is a Witotoan language formerly spoken in Colombia and Peru that is now nearly extinct. Genocide, disease, and forced migration caused the Sparrowhawk and Backpacker tribes to form families with the Andoke and the Muinane to create the Nonuya community. Most Nonuya have Muinane and Spanish as their native languages.

There are no surviving Nonuya people with Nononotá as their mother tongue as the last native speaker died in 2003. However, the Nonuya community has recently reestablished itself, and is attempting to revitalize its culture through revitalizing its language. The Nonuya use the available documentation created by the last native speakers between 1973 and 2007, which include prayers, songs, and a lexicon, to relearn the language. These documents are accessible today in audio files and transcripts which can be used for practical spelling.

Phonology 
Some of the only linguistic research on Nonuya was on its phonological and phonetic features, Nonuya has 6 vowels and 15 consonants. Nonuya has no nasal vowels, similar to its predecessor Witotoan.

Nonuya's six vowel system is typical of Northwest Amazonian languages. 

Some sources also suggest that Nonuya has two implosive sounds ( and /ɓ/), and distinguish labialised consonants.

Grammar 
Not much is known about Nonuya grammar as, until recently, the only linguistic studies done on Nonuya were on phonetic/phonological analysis but it can be inferred through the typical features known to Witotoan languages and the 1953 lexicon.

Features of Witotoan languages: 

 All Wititoan languages are nominative-accusative with agreement shown on the heads of phrases (head marking) and some elements of agreement marked on the dependent element of a phrase (dependent marking).
 They are predominantly agglutinating with some fusion and mostly suffixing. Though there are a few cases of prefixes.
 Syntactic functions are expressed using cross-referencing on the verb and case marking
 Word order is typically Agent Object Verb (SOV), but it may change, depending on context, to SVO
 Pronouns disinguish between male/female singular, male/female dual, and male/female plural

Cases 
There are six syntactical cases and seven locative cases in Nonuya: nominative, accusative, genitive, dative, ablative, locative, and instrumental.

Lexicon 
The first wordlist of Nonuya was created by Marquis Robert de Wavrin and Paul River in 1953 and included 394 words and expressions. The document compares Nonuya, Ocaina, and Witotoa and attempts to record the endangered language for future revival.

References  

Witotoan languages
Languages of Colombia
Languages of Peru
Endangered indigenous languages of the Americas
Articles citing ISO change requests